The 1984 Clemson Tigers football team was an American football team that represented Clemson University in the Atlantic Coast Conference (ACC) during the 1984 NCAA Division I-A football season. In its seventh season under head coach Danny Ford, the team compiled a 7–4 record (5–2 on the field against conference opponents, but officially 0–0), and outscored opponents by a total of 346 to 215. The team played its home games at Memorial Stadium in Clemson, South Carolina.

The 1984 season was Clemson's final season on probation for violation of recruiting rules.  The probation was imposed by the NCAA and ACC on November 21, 1982, and expired on January 2, 1985. As a result of the probation, the 1984 Clemson team was ineligible for the ACC championship and postseason play, and their games against ACC opponents were not counted in the official league standings.

Quarterback Mike Eppley and defensive tackle William Perry were the team captains. The team's statistical leaders included quarterback Mike Eppley with 1,484 passing yards, Stacey Driver with 627 rushing yards, Terrance Roulhac with 512 receiving yards, and placekicker Donald Igwebuike with 89 points scored (16 field goals, 41 extra points).

Schedule

Roster

1985 NFL Draft

References

Clemson
Clemson Tigers football seasons
Clemson Tigers football